Victim of Love is a 1989 studio album by American jazz singer Dee Dee Bridgewater.

Track listing

Personnel
Band
Dee Dee Bridgewater – vocals
Ray Charles – piano
Kjetil Bjerkestrand, keyboards, programming and arranger. 

Production
Steve Forward – mixing
Jean-Pierre Grosz – executive producer

References

External links 

Dee Dee Bridgewater albums
1989 albums
Polydor Records albums